In mathematics, a subring of R is a subset of a ring that is itself a ring when binary operations of addition and multiplication on R are restricted to the subset, and which shares the same multiplicative identity as R. For those who define rings without requiring the existence of a multiplicative identity, a subring of R is just a subset of R that is a ring for the operations of R (this does imply it contains the additive identity of R). The latter gives a strictly weaker condition, even for rings that do have a multiplicative identity, so that for instance all ideals become subrings (and they may have a multiplicative identity that differs from the one of R). With definition requiring a multiplicative identity (which is used in this article), the only ideal of R that is a subring of R is R itself.

Definition

Examples
The ring  and its quotients  have no subrings (with multiplicative identity) other than the full ring.

Every ring has a unique smallest subring, isomorphic to some ring  with n a nonnegative integer (see characteristic).

Subring test
The subring test is a theorem that states that for any ring R, a subset S of R is a subring if and only if it is closed under multiplication and subtraction, and contains the multiplicative identity of R.

As an example, the ring Z of integers is a subring of the field of real numbers and also a subring of the ring of polynomials Z[X].

Ring extensions

If S is a subring of a ring R, then equivalently R is said to be a ring extension of S, written as R/S in similar notation to that for field extensions.

Subring generated by a set

Let R be a ring. Any intersection of subrings of R is again a subring of R. Therefore, if X is any subset of R, the intersection of all subrings of R containing X is a subring S of R. S is the smallest subring of R containing X. ("Smallest" means that if T is any other subring of R containing X, then S is contained in T.) S is said to be the subring of R generated by X. If S = R, we may say that the ring R is generated by X.

Relation to ideals
Proper ideals are subrings (without unity) that are closed under both left and right multiplication by elements of R.

If one omits the requirement that rings have a unity element, then subrings need only be non-empty and otherwise conform to the ring structure, and ideals become subrings. Ideals may or may not have their own multiplicative identity (distinct from the identity of the ring):
The ideal I = {(z,0) | z in Z} of the ring Z × Z = {(x,y) | x,y in Z} with componentwise addition and multiplication has the identity (1,0), which is different from the identity (1,1) of the ring. So I is a ring with unity, and a "subring-without-unity", but not a "subring-with-unity" of Z × Z.
The proper ideals of Z have no multiplicative identity.

If I is a prime ideal of a commutative ring R, then the intersection of I with any subring S of R remains prime in S. In this case one says that I lies over I ∩ S. The situation is more complicated when R is not commutative.

Profile by commutative subrings
A ring may be profiled by the variety of commutative subrings that it hosts:
The quaternion ring H contains only the complex plane as a planar subring
The coquaternion ring contains three types of commutative planar subrings: the dual number plane, the split-complex number plane, as well as the ordinary complex plane
The ring of 3 × 3 real matrices also contains 3-dimensional commutative subrings generated by the identity matrix and a nilpotent ε of  order 3 (εεε = 0 ≠ εε). For instance, the Heisenberg group can be realized as the join of the groups of units of two of these nilpotent-generated subrings of 3 × 3 matrices.

See also
 Integral extension
 Group extension
 Algebraic extension
 Ore extension

References
 
 Page 84 of 
 

Ring theory